The BPOE Elks Club is a historic social club meeting house at 4th and Scott Streets in Little Rock, Arkansas.  It is a handsome three-story brick building, with Renaissance Revival features.  It was built in 1908 to a design by Theo Saunders.  Its flat roof has an extended cornice supported by slender brackets, and its main entrance is set in an elaborate round-arch opening with a recessed porch on the second level above.  Ground-floor windows are set in rounded arches, and are multi-section, while second-floor windows are rectangular, set above decorative aprons supported by brackets.

The building was listed on the National Register of Historic Places in 1982.

See also
National Register of Historic Places listings in Little Rock, Arkansas

References

Clubhouses on the National Register of Historic Places in Arkansas
Buildings and structures completed in 1908
Buildings and structures in Little Rock, Arkansas
Elks buildings
National Register of Historic Places in Little Rock, Arkansas
1908 establishments in Arkansas